Highs in the Mid-Sixties, Volume 13 (subtitled Texas, Part 3) is a compilation album in the Highs in the Mid-Sixties series, featuring recordings that were released in Texas.  This is one of five volumes in the series that collects songs by Texas bands; the others are Highs in the Mid-Sixties, Volume 11, Highs in the Mid-Sixties, Volume 12, Highs in the Mid-Sixties, Volume 17, and Highs in the Mid-Sixties, Volume 23.

Release data

This album was released in 1984 as an LP by AIP Records (as #AIP-10022).

Notes on the tracks

The Night Crawlers is not the same band as the garage rock band from San Antonio called the Nightcrawlers that featured a young Stevie Ray Vaughan.

Track listing

Side 1

 The Chessmen: "No More" (N. Green)
 The Briks: "Foolish Baby" (R. Borgen/C. Cotten)
 Robb London & the Rogues: "Gloria" (Van Morrison)
 The Fanatics: "I Will Not Be Lonely" (Neal Ford)
 The Venturie "5": "Good 'n' Bad" (Clark Keith)
 Mustache Wax: "I'm Gonna Get You" (Eddie DiBiase)
 The Bards: "Alibis" (Ronny & Rick McLaughlin)

Side 2

 The Barons: "Don't Burn It" (J. Nitzinger)
 Theze Few: "Dynamite" (D. Feals) — rel. 1966
 The Madison Revue: "Another Man" (R. Rountree/D. Fisher)
 The Roots: "Lost One" (Rudy Wyatt)
 The Night Crawlers: "Let's Move" (Larry L. Priest)
 The Zone V: "I Cannot Lie" (R. Bartell/E. Davis)
 The Moon-Dawgs: "Baby as Time Goes By" (Tommy Guarino/Bonnie Fussell)

Pebbles (series) albums
1984 compilation albums
Music of Texas